Juho Niukkanen (27 July 1888 in Kirvu – 17 May 1954 in Helsinki) was a Finnish politician prior to, during, and after the Winter War. He was a member of parliament from 1916 to 1933 and again from 1936 to 1954, and represented the Agrarian Party (Maalaisliitto). He served as a minister in many cabinets. His most important office were as Minister of Finance on three occasions, and as Minister of Defence from 1937 to 1940.

Juho Niukkanen was a favourite subject of many puns and jokes, because his name is derived from the adjective niukka (bare, meagre, economical).

References

1888 births
1954 deaths
People from Vyborg District
People from Viipuri Province (Grand Duchy of Finland)
Centre Party (Finland) politicians
Ministers of Finance of Finland
Ministers of Defence of Finland
Members of the Parliament of Finland (1916–17)
Members of the Parliament of Finland (1917–19)
Members of the Parliament of Finland (1919–22)
Members of the Parliament of Finland (1922–24)
Members of the Parliament of Finland (1924–27)
Members of the Parliament of Finland (1927–29)
Members of the Parliament of Finland (1929–30)
Members of the Parliament of Finland (1930–33)
Members of the Parliament of Finland (1936–39)
Members of the Parliament of Finland (1939–45)
Members of the Parliament of Finland (1945–48)
Members of the Parliament of Finland (1948–51)
Members of the Parliament of Finland (1951–54)
People of the Finnish Civil War (White side)
Finnish people of World War II